Shorea ochrophloia (called, along with some other species in the genus Shorea, red balau) is a species of plant in the family Dipterocarpaceae. It is native Sumatra and Peninsular Malaysia.

References

ochrophloia
Trees of Sumatra
Trees of Peninsular Malaysia
Vulnerable flora of Asia
Taxonomy articles created by Polbot